Everson Rodrigues, known as Everson Ratinho or simply Ratinho (born June 8, 1971) is a Brazilian football coach and former player. Until summer 2011, he managed the youth team of 1. FC Kaiserslautern.

Honours
 2. Bundesliga: 1996–97
 Bundesliga: 1997–98
 DFB-Pokal finalist: 2002–03

References

External links
 
 

Living people
1971 births
Association football midfielders
Brazilian footballers
Brazilian football managers
Club Athletico Paranaense players
FC St. Gallen players
FC Aarau players
1. FC Kaiserslautern players
FC Zhenis Astana players
FC Luzern players
Swiss Super League players
Bundesliga players
2. Bundesliga players
Brazilian expatriate footballers
Brazilian expatriate sportspeople in Germany
Expatriate footballers in Germany
Brazilian expatriate sportspeople in Kazakhstan
Expatriate footballers in Kazakhstan